Joseph Szigeti (1892–1973) was a Hungarian violinist.

Szigeti may also refer to:

 Cynthia Szigeti (1949–2016), American comic actress
 Florencia Szigeti (born 1981), freestyle swimmer
 György Szigeti (1905–1978), Hungarian inventor and physicist
 Lajos Szigeti (1906–1974), boxer
 Oszkár Szigeti (1933–1983), football defender
 Ottó Szigeti (1911–1976), tennis player
 Zoltán Szigeti (1932–2009), sprint canoer

See also
 Szigeti (grape) or Furmint, a Hungarian wine grape

Hungarian-language surnames